Château Gaillard or Château-Gaillard may refer to:

Château Gaillard, a ruined medieval castle, overlooking the River Seine, in Upper Normandy, France.
Château-Gaillard (Vannes),  a French hôtel particulier and an archaeological museum Vannes, Brittany.
Château-Gaillard, Ain, a commune in the Ain department in eastern France.
Château Gaillard, a restored mansion in the town of Amboise, France, owned by Marc Lelandais.